Ptochostola is a genus of moths of the family Crambidae.

Species
Ptochostola asaphes Turner, 1937
Ptochostola dirutellus (Walker, 1866)
Ptochostola metascotiella Hampson, 1919
Ptochostola microphaeellus (Walker, 1866)

References

Natural History Museum Lepidoptera genus database

Crambinae
Crambidae genera
Taxa named by Edward Meyrick